The Ape is a 2009 Swedish drama film directed by Jesper Ganslandt. It is Ganslandt's second feature film, following Falkenberg Farewell from 2006. Inspired by British director Mike Leigh, the film uses an unconventional method where the lead actor, Olle Sarri, wasn't allowed to read the script. Instead he was led to locations and instructed before the filming of each scene, unaware of the full plot until filming was completed. The title comes from an anecdote composer Erik Enocksson once told the director, where he while travelling on a packed bus suddenly got the feeling that all people around him were apes.

Cast
Olle Sarri as Krister
Françoise Joyce as the mother
Sean Pietrulewicz as the son
Niclas Gillis as Jonas
Samuel Haus as Jonas' friend
Eva Rexed as driving school student
Lennart Andersson as the neighbour
Lena Carlsson as the wife
Thore Flygel as salesman
Anders Johannisson as man in the square
Sonny Johnson as Police

Release
The Ape premiered on 3 September 2009 at the Venice Film Festival, in the section Venice Days. It was subsequently shown as part of the Vanguard section at the 2009 Toronto International Film Festival and at the London International Film Festival, in October 2009.

Reception
On review aggregator website Rotten Tomatoes, the film has a 100% approval rating based on 8 reviews, with an average rating of 7.3/10.

References

External links

Swedish thriller films
2009 thriller films
2000s Swedish-language films
2000s Swedish films